This is a list of the Maryland state historical markers in Howard County.

This is intended to be a complete list of the official state historical markers placed in Howard County, Maryland by the Maryland Historical Trust (MHT). The locations of the historical markers, as well as the latitude and longitude coordinates as provided by the MHT's database, are included below. There are currently 19 historical markers located in Howard County.

References 

Howard County